McLaren Vale is a town and locality in the Australian state of South Australia located about  south of the Adelaide city centre and about  south of the municipal seat at Noarlunga Centre.

History
The township was formed in 1923 from a merging of the two original villages of Gloucester and Bellevue, which were established in the 1840s. Boundaries for the locality were defined on 13 July 1995 for the portion within the former City of Noarlunga with the portion in the former District Council of Willunga being added on 28 January 1999.  Land within the former locality of Landcross Farm was added on 16 March 2000.

The source of the name has been attributed by several writers to either David McLaren of the South Australian Company or John McLaren of the colonial government's Land Office. Geoff Manning, a South Australian historian, investigated this matter and found that the latter person is the namesake.

Geography and demographics
The town and locality is located within the McLaren Vale wine region.

Former Newsboys frontman Peter Furler was born in McLaren Vale.
 
The Coast to Vines rail trail passes through McLaren Vale. There was a station at McLaren Vale on the former Willunga railway line that it follows.

The main road junction into the town, at Victor Harbor Road and Main Road, has over the years been notorious for fatal crashes. In 2011, construction started on an overpass, to remove the threat of right hand turns through high speed traffic. The overpass opened in late 2012.

There were two supermarkets in the town, a Foodland and a BI-LO (where Browse and Save currently operates), until Foodland was sold, and Bilo moved into the vacancy. In 2006, BI-LO converted to Coles along with the national conversion. In 2011, it was announced that the shopping centre would be undergoing an upgrade, with a Target Country. Target Country will occupy the current Coles location, after a new, bigger Coles is built behind its current location. The complete shopping centre is expected to open in early 2013.

At the 2016 census, the locality of McLaren Vale had a population of 3,842 and a median age of 52 of which 3,096 lived in its town centre.

McLaren Vale is located within the federal division of Mayo, the state electoral district of Mawson and the local government area of the City of Onkaparinga.

References

External links

Towns in South Australia
Suburbs of Adelaide